In enzymology, a L-ascorbate oxidase is an enzyme that catalyzes the chemical reaction

2 L-ascorbate + O2  2 dehydroascorbate + 2 H2O

Thus, the two substrates of this enzyme are L-ascorbate and O2, whereas its two products are dehydroascorbate and H2O.

Function 

This enzyme belongs to the family of oxidoreductases, specifically those acting on diphenols and related substances as donor with oxygen as acceptor.  This enzyme participates in ascorbate metabolism.  It employs one cofactor, copper.

Nomenclature 

The systematic name of this enzyme class is L-ascorbate:oxygen oxidoreductase. Other names in common use include ascorbase, ascorbic acid oxidase, ascorbate oxidase, ascorbic oxidase, ascorbate dehydrogenase, L-ascorbic acid oxidase, AAO, L-ascorbate:O2 oxidoreductase, and AA oxidase.

References

Further reading 

 

EC 1.10.3
Copper enzymes
Enzymes of known structure